Cohn on the Saxophone is an album by saxophonist Al Cohn recorded in 1956 for the Dawn label.

Track listing
All compositions by Al Cohn except as indicated
 "We Three" (Nelson Cogane, Sammy Mysels, Dick Robertson) - 3:48
 "Idaho" (Jesse Stone) - 3:37
 "The Things I Love" (Harold Barlow, Lew Harris) - 3:52
 "Singing The Blues" (J. Russel Robinson, Con Conrad, Sam M. Lewis, Joe Young) - 5:06
 "Be Loose" - 4:18
 "When Day Is Done" (Buddy DeSylva) - 3:54
 "Good Old Blues" - 4:49
 "Softly, as in a Morning Sunrise" (Oscar Hammerstein II, Sigmund Romberg) - 3:18
 "Abstract of You" - 3:44
 "Blue Lou" (Irving Mills, Edgar Sampson) - 4:09
 "Them There Eyes" (Maceo Pinkard, Doris Tauber, William Tracey) - 4:09 Bonus track on CD reissue

Personnel 
Al Cohn - tenor saxophone
Frank Rehak - trombone
Hank Jones - piano
Milt Hinton - bass
Osie Johnson - drums

References 

1957 albums
Al Cohn albums